Mount Toth is the easternmost peak, 2,410 m, on the small ice-covered ridge 5 nautical miles (9 km) east of Mount Kendrick, in the Queen Maud Mountains. Mapped by United States Geological Survey (USGS) from surveys and U.S. Navy air photos, 1960–64. Named by Advisory Committee on Antarctic Names (US-ACAN) for Commander Arpad J. Toth, U.S. Navy Reserve, operations officer in charge of Williams Field, McMurdo Sound, 1962–64.

Mountains of the Ross Dependency
Amundsen Coast